The Volta a Tarragona was a multi-day road cycling race held annually in the Province of Tarragona, Spain. The race took place from 1908 until 2010.

Winners

References

1908 establishments in Spain
2010 disestablishments in Spain
Cycle races in Spain
Defunct cycling races in Spain
Recurring sporting events established in 1925
Recurring sporting events disestablished in 2010
Cycle racing in Catalonia